Miss France 2012 was the 82nd Miss France pageant, held in Brest on 3 December 2011. Miss France 2012, Laury Thilleman of Brittany crowned her successor Delphine Wespiser of Alsace at the end of the event. 

It was the first time that the pageant took place in Brest and in the Brittany region.

It was presented by the national director Sylvie Tellier and Jean-Pierre Foucault for the 17th consecutive year. The event was broadcast live by TF1.

The winner was Miss Alsace, Delphine Wespiser, who gave to her region its sixth Miss France title.

Results

Preparation
The 33 contestants, Laury Thilleman and the national director Sylvie Tellier had travelled to Cancun, in Mexico from November, 3 to November, 12.
The rehearsals took place in Brest.

Contestants

Ranking

First round 
A jury composed of partners (internal and external) of the company Miss France pre-selects 12 young women, during an interview that took place on 1 December.

Second round 
The 50% jury and the 50% public choose the five candidates who can still be elected. A ranking of 1 to 12 is established for each of the two parties. In the event of a tie, the jury's ranking prevails : it explains the Top 5 placement of Miss Provence instead of Miss Martinique.

Last round 
Only the audience can choose the winner and her runners-up by voting.

Special prizes

Judges

Crossovers 
Contestants who previously competed or will be competing at international beauty pageants:

Miss World
2012 :  Alsace – Delphine Wespiser 
 (Ordos City)

Miss Universe
2012 :  Réunion  – Marie Payet (Top 10)
 (Las Vegas)

Miss Supranational
2012 :  Provence – Solène Froment (Top 20)
 (Warsaw)

References

External links

2011 in France
December 2011 events in France
Miss France
2011 beauty pageants
Brest, France